Vladimir Jakovlevich Kachalov (27 July 1890 – 4 August 1941) was a Soviet lieutenant general. He fought in the Imperial Russian Army during World War I before going over to the Bolsheviks in the subsequent Civil War. He was a recipient of the Order of the Red Banner and the Order of the Patriotic War. He was promoted to Komdiv in 1936, Komkor in 1938, and then Komandarm 2nd rank in 1939. He was killed in action at Smolensk by artillery fire. Joseph Stalin, unaware of his death because of an inaccurate report of the events by Lev Mekhlis, stated in Order No. 270 that Kachalov surrendered and defected to the Nazis; he was subsequently sentenced to death in absentia. It was not until 1953 that an investigation established the circumstances of Kachalov's death and cleared his name.

Bibliography
 

 
 Жуков Г. К. «Воспоминания и размышления» В 2 т. — М.: Олма-Пресс, 2002.
 Лукин М. Ф. "Мы не сдаёмся, товарищ генерал!" // Огонёк. 1964. №52. С. 16.

Sources
 Т. Сидорова. Трагедия генерала Качалова.

1890 births
1941 deaths
Russian military personnel of World War I
Soviet military personnel of the Russian Civil War
Soviet military personnel killed in World War II
Soviet lieutenant generals
Recipients of the Order of the Red Banner
Frunze Military Academy alumni